Raul Radice (19 March 1902 - 1988) was an Italian novelist and journalist.

Born in Milan, Radice was a theatrical and film critic for various publications, including Il Giornale d'Italia and Corriere della Sera. Also a novelist, in 1934 he won the  Bagutta Prize for  his novel Vita comica di Corinna.

After the death of founder Silvio D'Amico, Radice served as president of the Accademia d'Arte Drammatica in Rome.

References

External links 

 

1902 births
1988 deaths
Writers from Milan
Italian novelists
Journalists from Milan
Italian male journalists
20th-century Italian writers
20th-century Italian male writers
20th-century Italian journalists